San José del Talar is a church in Buenos Aires in Argentina.

Church and parish (Parroquia San Jose del Talar) are located in Calle Navarro  2460, 1419 Ciudad De Buenos Aires (Agronomía).

Mary Untier of Knots 

In this church is a miraculous image of Mary Untier of Knots, visited every 8th of the month by thousands of pilgrims. The picture found the way from St. Peter am Perlach in Augsburg to Buenos Aires by the Jesuit Jorge Mario Bergoglio (Pope Francis).

References

External links 
 Parish San Jose del Talar - (official site on Facebook)

Buildings and structures in Buenos Aires
Tourist attractions in Buenos Aires
Christianity in Buenos Aires
Roman Catholic churches in Buenos Aires